Kevin Richard Light (born May 16, 1979) is a Canadian rower.

Early life
He was born in Vancouver, British Columbia but has lived in Victoria, British Columbia since 1985. 

He began rowing at Stelly's High School in grade 12 and graduated in 1997. He was enrolled at the University of Victoria from 1997 until 2001 where he was part of numerous Canadian University Rowing Championships teams. The highlight of his university rowing career came in 2001 when Uvic beat the University of Washington at the Opening Day Regatta. He won the gold medal at both the 2003 and 2002 World Championships in Canada's men's eight team in Milan, Italy and Seville, Spain respectively. At the 2004 Summer Olympics, Light and his crew finished 5th in the finals of the men's eight. 

Light graduated from the Victoria Motion Picture School in 2004/2005 and then the Western Academy of Photography in 2008/2009, where he studied photojournalism.

Career
In 2006 Light represented Canada along with fellow Victoria rower Malcolm Howard in the men's straight pair.  The two combined for a thrilling come from behind sprint moving from 6th into a bronze medal position with 500m to go at the 2006 World Rowing Championships at Eton, England.

In 2007 Light again won the gold medal at world championship in the eight in Munich, Germany. He was named to the Canadian men's eight for the 2008 Olympic games to be held in Beijing, China.

He won a gold medal at the 2008 Summer Olympics in the men's eights with Andrew Byrnes, Kyle Hamilton, Malcolm Howard, Adam Kreek, Ben Rutledge, Dominic Sieterle, Jake Wetzel and cox Brian Price.

In September 2012, he was brought on at Claremont Secondary School as a coach and manager. For his debut as head coach at the CSSRA in St. Catherines, Ontario, Light led the team to gold medals in three different events: the senior women's quad, the junior men's double and the junior men's quad. He coached throughout the next three years, leaving in June 2015.

Videos
Light has produced many videos, including some that feature footage of the Canada Men's team training. One of them was an entry for a competition by Concept2. Balls Away was shot in San Francisco while on a training camp in 2007. It was done with the Sony Bravia commercial in mind.

Personal life
Light has a sister named Heather Light who was born on June 23, 1981. She works at Thrifty Foods and swims for the Special Olympics team in Victoria.

References

External links
Rowing Canada – Hwt. Men – 2007 Team

 http://kevinlight.photoshelter.com
 http://500px.com/kevinlightphotography
Kevin Light on Real Champions
Ball's Away
Inches
Kevin's Erg Video

1979 births
Living people
Canadian male rowers
Olympic rowers of Canada
Olympic gold medalists for Canada
Rowers at the 2004 Summer Olympics
Rowers at the 2008 Summer Olympics
Rowers from Vancouver
Medalists at the 2008 Summer Olympics
Olympic medalists in rowing
University of Victoria alumni